Bernie is a given name, most often a shortened form of Bernard, and may refer to:

 Bernie Babcock (1868–1962), real name Julia Burnelle Smade Babcock, American author
 Bernie Bickerstaff (born 1944), American former National Basketball Association head coach
 Bernie Casey (1939–2017), American actor, poet, and professional football player
 Bernie Ebbers (1941–2020), Canadian businessman, founder and former chief executive officer of WorldCom
 Bernie Ecclestone (born 1930), British sports entrepreneur
 Bernie Erickson (born 1944), American football player
 Bernie Geoffrion (1931–2006), Canadian National Hockey League Hall-of-Fame player and coach
 Bernie Goetz (born 1947), American vigilante
 Bernie Kopell (born 1933), American actor
 Bernie Kosar (born 1963), American former National Football League quarterback
 Bernie Leahy (1908–1978), American football player
 Bernie Lewis (born 1945), Welsh former footballer
 Bernie Mac (1957–2008), American comedian, actor, and voice actor
 Bernie Madoff (1938–2021), American convicted scammer and businessman
 Bernie Mangiboyat, American musician and founder of the band The Fifth
 Bernie Opper (1915–2000), American basketball player
 Bernie Parent (born 1945), Canadian former National Hockey League goaltender
 Bernie Sanders (born 1941), American senator and presidential candidate
 Bernie Taupin (born 1950), longtime lyricist for Elton John
 Bernie Tiede (born 1958), American mortician and convicted murderer
 Bernie Wagenblast (born 1956), American journalist and voice-over artist
 Bernie Williams (born 1968), Puerto Rican former Major League Baseball player
 Bernie Willock, Canadian cyclist and businessman
 Bernie Wijesekara (1930-2014), Sri Lankan Sinhala sports journalist
 Bernie Wolfe (hockey) (born 1951), Canadian NHL hockey player
 Bernie Worrell (1944–2016), American keyboardist and composer

Fictional Characters
 Bernie Abrahms, on the soap opera General Hospital
 Bernie Steinberg, one of the main characters of the 1972–1973 television series Bridget Loves Bernie
 Bernie (Doonesbury), a comic strip character
 Bernie, a Beanie Baby St. Bernard produced by Ty, Inc.
 Bernie Barges, one of the main protagonists of the animated TV series Watch My Chops
 Bernie Kropp, a minor character in the 2004 Pixar film The Incredibles

Hypocorisms
Masculine given names
English masculine given names